Çömlekçi can refer to the following villages in Turkey:

 Çömlekçi, Biga
 Çömlekçi, Bigadiç
 Çömlekçi, Çaycuma